Jib Tunnel, also known as Lateral Passage is one of the entrances into the Gaping Gill cave system, located behind a large boulder in the north bank of Fell Beck adjacent to Gaping Gill Main Shaft. Although short, it leads to Lateral Shaft, a direct descent into Gaping Gill Main Chamber which is a popular caving route, and has had considerable significance in the history of the exploration of Gaping Gill. It lies within the designated Ingleborough Site of Special Scientific Interest.

Description

A short wriggle between the shakehole wall and a large boulder leads into the roomy passage. After  this abruptly  drops  to the floor of the Main Chamber. The route then leaves the shaft to drop down the rift above the Main Chamber, before emerging through the roof and dropping the final  to the floor.

Spout Tunnel can be entered by swinging in from a rope or ladder. The passage becomes narrow, and after  the main water enters down a  pitch. Above this a further  climb enters  of passage which gets too small close to a sink in Fell Beck opposite Rat Hole Sink. Below the pitch a small passage continues for another , and is thought to drain the area just to the east of the blind valley.

History

Professor McKenny Hughes reported that the entrance was blocked with glacial fill until a flood in 1872, when it got washed out. In 1895 Edward Calvert, of the Yorkshire Ramblers' Club, attempted to replicate Edouard Martel's descent of the Main Shaft of a few weeks earlier, but failed to get beyond Birkbeck's Ledge at  because of the quantity of water. Looking up, he could see that the shaft divided behind a curtain. Later in the year he entered Jib Tunnel, and realised that this was the parallel shaft that he had seen, and that a man could be lowered directly to the floor of the Main Chamber from its lip. The following year, he set up a series of jibs and pulleys, and was lowered in a boatswain's chair, becoming the second person to reach the Main Chamber. Jib Tunnel was used for explorations of the system until 1921, when the current system of lowering the winch from a gantry positioned across the corner of the Main Shaft was developed.

There have been three deaths in the cave. In 1982 Ted Holstead died after losing control when abseiling down the shaft. In 1989 Keith Mann died of exposure whilst prusiking up the shaft on rope. In 1995 eleven-year-old Lee Craddock wandered into Jib Tunnel and fell down the shaft to his death whilst on an outing organised by the Scouting Association.

References

Caves of North Yorkshire
Wild caves
Limestone caves